John William Holden Gastall (25 May 1913 – 1997) was an English professional association footballer who played as a centre forward.

References

1913 births
1997 deaths
People from Oswaldtwistle
English footballers
Association football forwards
Blackburn Rovers F.C. players
Burscough F.C. players
Darwen F.C. players
Bacup Borough F.C. players
Burnley F.C. players
Accrington Stanley F.C. (1891) players
Rochdale A.F.C. players
English Football League players